Koliada or koleda (Cyrillic: коляда, коледа, колада, коледе) is the traditional  Slavic name for the period from Christmas to Epiphany or, more generally, for Slavic Christmas-related rituals, some dating to  pre-Christian times. It represents a festival or holiday, celebrated at the end of December to honor the sun during the Northern-hemisphere winter solstice. It also involves groups of singers who visit houses to sing  carols.

Terminology
The word is still used in modern  Ukrainian ("Коляда", Koliadá), Belarusian (Каляда, Kalada, Kaliada), Polish (Szczodre Gody kolęda ), Bulgarian, Macedonian, Serbo-Croatian (Коледа, Коледе, koleda, kolenda), Lithuanian (Kalėdos, Kalėda), Czech, Slovak, Slovene (koleda) and Romanian (Colindă).

The word used in Old Church Slavonic language (Колѧда - Kolęnda) sounds closest to the current Polish language pronunciation, as Polish is one of two Slavic languages which retains the nasal vowels of the Proto-Slavic language (the other is closely related Kashubian). One theory states that Koliada is the name of a cycle of winter rituals stemming from the ancient calendae as for example the Kalenda Proclamation.

In modern Belarusian, Ukrainian (koliada), Czech, Slovak, Croatian (koleda, kolenda), Kashubian (kòlãda [kwɛlãda]) and Polish (kolęda , Old Polish kolenda) the meaning has shifted from Christmas itself to denoting the tradition of strolling, singing, and having fun on Christmas Eve, same in the Balkan Slavs. It specifically applies to children and teens who walk house to house greeting people, singing and sifting grain that denotes the best wishes and receiving candy and small money in return. The action is called kolyadovanye in Russian, kolyaduvannya (Ukrainian колядування) in Ukrainian and is now applied to similar Old East Slavic celebrations of other old significant holidays, such as Generous Eve the evening before New Year's Day, as well as the celebration of the arrival of spring. Similarly in Bulgaria and North Macedonia, in the tradition of koleduvane (коледуване) or koledarenje (коледарење) around Christmas, groups of children visiting houses, singing carols and receiving a gift at parting. The kids are called 'koledari' or rarely 'kolezhdani' who sing kolyadki (songs).

Koleda is also celebrated across northern Greece by the Slavic speakers of Greek Macedonia, in areas from Florina to Thessaloniki, where it is called Koleda (Κόλιντα, Κόλιαντα) or  Koleda Babo (Κόλιντα Μπάμπω) which means "Koleda Grandmother" in Slavic. It is celebrated before Christmas by gathering in the village square and lighting a bonfire, followed by local Macedonian music and dancing.

Croatian composer Jakov Gotovac wrote in 1925 the composition "Koleda", which he called a "folk rite in five parts", for male choir and small orchestra (3 clarinets, 2 bassoons, timpani and drum). Also, Dubrovnik kolenda is one of the oldest recorded traditions of this kind in Croatia (its first mentioned in 13th century). There is also a dance from Dubrovnik called "The Dubrovnik Koleda."

It is celebrated in the Büyükmandıra village of Babaeski district, Kırklareli Province in Turkey as a halloween-like festival and dates a thousand years back.

See also

 Colindă, a similar Romanian/Moldovan tradition
 Korochun
 Crăciun (disambiguation)
 Twelfth Night (holiday)
 Yule
 Christmas carol
List of Christmas carols
 Koliadka
 Koledari
 Turoń
 Koleda (Koledovanie) in the Serbian tradition
 Kalenda Proclamation
 Shchedryk (song)
 Calennig
 Christmas Waits
 Beltane, Gaelic festival in honour of the sun

References

Intangible Cultural Heritage of Humanity
Slavic culture
Slavic holidays
Folk calendar of the East Slavs
Belarusian traditions
Bulgarian traditions
Czech traditions
Polish traditions
Russian traditions
Serbian traditions
Slovak traditions
Ukrainian traditions
Slavic Christmas traditions